Beqadar is a 2022 Pakistani social soap opera television series aired on Hum TV, produced by Momina Duraid. It features Anum Fayyaz, Hassan Ahmed, Faria Hassan, Hammad Farooqui, Sumaiyya Buksh and Faraz Farooqui in lead roles.

Cast
Anum Fayyaz as Mahrukh: Komal's younger sister
Hassan Ahmed as Sarmad: Komal's husband
Hammad Farooqui as Yasir: fiance of Mahrukh
Fariya Hassan as Neelam: Niece of Aliya
Sumaiyya Bukhsh as Umeed: Sarmad and Komal's daughter
Michelle Mumtaz as Ramal: Sarmad and Mahrukh's daughter
Faraz Farooqui as Junaid: Yasir and Neelam's elder son
Hamza Tariq Jamil as Adeel: Yasir and Neelam's younger son
Shaista Jabeen as Aliya: Sarmad, Sawera's mother and Neelam's aunt, Komal's mother-in-law
Mariam Tiwana as Sawera: Sarmad younger sister
Ayesha Rajpoot as Zara: Sawera's daughter
Shiraz Ghazali as Farhan: Sarmad and Mahrukh's son
Huma Nawab as Farzana: Komal and Mahrukh's mother
Farah Nadeem as Rukhsana: Yasir's mother
Khalid Anum as Munawar: Komal and Mahrukh's father
Sajid Shah as Rasheed: Yasir's father
Tooba Khan as Sarah: Umeed's university friend
Hassan Mujtaba as Principal: Head Master of the university

Guest Appearance
Zhalay Sarhadi as Komal: Sarmad's wife and Mahrukh's sister
Umair Leghari as Jameel: care taker of Umeed when she got lost
Asma Saif as Saima: Jameel's wife

Child Stars
 Eshaal Khan as Umeed
Mantasha as Ramal
Abdul Muqeet as Farhan

References

External Links
Beqadar- Hum TV official site

2022 Pakistani television series debuts
2022 Pakistani television series endings
Hum TV original programming
Pakistani drama television series